Camping, also known as campyon, campan, or campball, was a football game played in England. It appears to have been popular in Norfolk and other parts of East Anglia. Of all the traditional forms of football played in Europe, it appears to have been one of the toughest and most dangerous, which probably explains why it died out during the early 19th century.

The first English-Latin dictionary, Promptorium parvulorum (circa 1440), offers this definition of camp ball: "Campan, or playar at foott balle, pediluson; campyon, or champion" 

The game was originally played in the middle of town, where the objective was to take the ball to the opposing side of town. It was later played in the country, often in a special field set aside for the purpose known as a camping-place, camping close, or camping pightle. A reminder of this old game can be found in Swaffham, where behind the market place lies the Camping land, where the game was played. The custom in medieval times was to play games after church services, and often camping fields were sited near the church.

Although this game was rough, it was not without rules. In fact, evidence from Moore (1823) indicates  teams, goals, rules, and even ball passing existed between team members (a development often attributed to a much later time): 

If the game described by Moore in 1823 was substantially the same as medieval "camping", then  despite the Promptorium's notable definition of it as a form of "foott balle," the game apparently involved no kicking and was rather reminiscent of the passing game in rugby.

A match at Diss Common in the early 19th century reportedly was so brutal that nine men were killed or died of their injuries. While some people thought that camping was a combination of all athletic excellence, others saw it as little more than a stand-up fight. The contest for the ball "never ends without black eyes and bloody noses, broken heads or shins, and some serious mischief," a writer  said in 1830, when camping popularity was at its height.

A modified game called "civil play" banned boxing as a component of the game. The game was played by passing the ball from hand to hand. To score, a player had to carry the ball through his own goal. Matches were usually for the best of seven or nine goals or "snotches", which normally took two to three hours, but a game of 14 hours had been recorded in a county match.

A feature of so-called friendly matches were prizes for those who played well. These consisted of money, hats, gloves, or shoes. Incidents of violence seem in the end to have turned public opinion against camping, and it was gradually replaced by a gentler kicking game. This game had roused great scorn amongst camping enthusiasts when it first began to make its influence felt in the 1830s.

References 

West Norfolk.gov.uk 
PastTimes on the Web

Traditional football